Hild or Hildr may refer to:

 Hildr or Hild is one of the Valkyries in Norse mythology, a personification of battle
 Hild or Hilda of Whitby is a Christian saint who was a British abbess and nun in the Middle Ages
 Hild (Oh My Goddess!), the ultimate Demon in Hell known as the Daimakaichō in the  Oh My Goddess! series
 Hild (novel), a 2013 novel about Hilda of Whitby by Nicola Griffith

See also 
 Hilda
 Hilde (disambiguation)
 Hildegard (disambiguation)
 Hildreth (disambiguation)
 Brynhildr
 Brunhilda of Austrasia (543–613)
 Gunhilda (born 10th century),
 Hildebrand